March 21 - Eastern Orthodox liturgical calendar - March 23

All fixed commemorations below are observed on April 4 by Eastern Orthodox Churches on the Old Calendar.

For March 22nd, Orthodox Churches on the Old Calendar commemorate the Saints listed on March 9.

Saints

 Virgin-confessor Drosida (Drosis) of Antioch, daughter of Emperor Trajan, and with her five Virgin-martyrs (104-117)  (see also: July 28)
 Martyrs Kalliniki and Vasilissa of Rome (252)
 Hieromartyr Basil of Ancyra, Priest of Ancyra (362)
 Saint Isaac the Confessor, founder of the Dalmatian Monastery at Constantinople (383)  (see also: May 30)

Pre-Schism Western saints

 Saint Epaphroditus, by tradition the first Bishop of Terracina in Italy (1st century)
 Saint Paul, Bishop of Narbonne, Brittany (3rd century)
 Saint Lea of Rome, an aristocrat in Rome who on the death of her husband entered the convent of St Marcella (384)
 Saint Deogratius, Bishop of Carthage in North Africa (457)
 Saint Octavian and Companions, Archdeacon of the Church in Carthage in North Africa, martyred with several thousand companions under the Arian Vandal King Hunneric (484)
 Saint Saturninus and Companions, a group of ten martyrs in North Africa.
 Saint Trien (Trienan), a disciple of St Patrick and Abbot of Killelga in Ireland (5th century)
 Saint Darerca of Ireland, sister of St Patrick of Ireland (5th century)
 Saint Fáilbe mac Pípáin, the eighth Abbot of Iona in Scotland (680)

Post-Schism Orthodox saints

 Martyr Basil of Mangazea in Siberia, Wonderworker (1602)  (see also: June 6 and May 10 - Translation of Relics) 
 New Monk-martyr Euthymius of Dimitsana and Mt. Athos, at Constantinople (1814)

New martyrs and confessors

 Hieromartyr Basil (Zelentsov), Bishop of Prilutsk, Vicar of Poltava (1930)
 New Confessor Schema-abbess Sophia (Grineva) of Kiev (1941), and her priest Demetrius Ivanov (1934)

Other commemorations

 "The Izborsk" Icon of the Mother of God (1657)
 Commemoration of Maria Berushko of Brazil and eight students who died trying to save people during a fire in their school (1986)

Icon gallery

Notes

References

Sources
 March 22/April 4. Orthodox Calendar (PRAVOSLAVIE.RU).
 April 4 / March 22. HOLY TRINITY RUSSIAN ORTHODOX CHURCH (A parish of the Patriarchate of Moscow).
 March 22. OCA - The Lives of the Saints.
 The Autonomous Orthodox Metropolia of Western Europe and the Americas (ROCOR). St. Hilarion Calendar of Saints for the year of our Lord 2004. St. Hilarion Press (Austin, TX). p. 23.
 March 22. Latin Saints of the Orthodox Patriarchate of Rome.
 The Roman Martyrology. Transl. by the Archbishop of Baltimore. Last Edition, According to the Copy Printed at Rome in 1914. Revised Edition, with the Imprimatur of His Eminence Cardinal Gibbons. Baltimore: John Murphy Company, 1916. pp. 83–84.
Greek Sources
 Great Synaxaristes:  22 ΜΑΡΤΙΟΥ. ΜΕΓΑΣ ΣΥΝΑΞΑΡΙΣΤΗΣ.
  Συναξαριστής. 22 Μαρτίου. ECCLESIA.GR. (H ΕΚΚΛΗΣΙΑ ΤΗΣ ΕΛΛΑΔΟΣ). 
Russian Sources
  4 апреля (22 марта). Православная Энциклопедия под редакцией Патриарха Московского и всея Руси Кирилла (электронная версия). (Orthodox Encyclopedia - Pravenc.ru).
  22 марта (ст.ст.) 4 апреля 2013 (нов. ст.). Русская Православная Церковь Отдел внешних церковных связей. (DECR).

March in the Eastern Orthodox calendar